Motive, Inc. (previously Motive Communications) was a software manufacturer founded in May 1997 and headquartered in Austin, Texas.

On June 17, 2008, Alcatel-Lucent announced that it had entered into a definitive agreement to acquire Motive Inc. through a cash tender offer for all outstanding Motive shares at a price of US$2.23 per share, representing a value of approximately $67.8 million.

Products 
Companies worldwide used Motive software in their online services. Motive-powered e-service networks were being used in the online economy by companies as diverse as Compaq, Dell, EDS, Gateway, Hewlett-Packard, Intuit, Kmart, Merrill Lynch, Norwest, Oracle, Peregrine, and Target.

The acquisition extended Alcatel-Lucent and Motive's profitable three-year partnership. Both companies developed and sold remote management software for automating the installation, setup, and maintenance of residential gateways for home networking. There were already more than 40 joint customers amongst Alcatel-Lucent and Motive, including AT&T, Verizon, BT, Vodafone Portugal, and Swisscom.

Timeline
May 1997: Company founded by Scott Harmon, Scott Abel, Mike Maples Jr, Brian Vetter, Tom Bereiter
 
July, 1998: Releases its first product, signs Hewlett-Packard Co. as its first major customer.

Dec, 1999: Spins off all.com

2000–2003: Acquires three other Austin companies (Ventix, Question.com, BroadJump); merges with All.com.

June 25, 2004: Initial public offering; shares rise 1.5 percent to $10.15.

Oct. 27, 2005: Restates earnings for first and second quarters of 2005; cuts one-third of work force.

Nov. 14, 2005: Announces informal SEC inquiry into restatement of results (linked to revenue from resellers) and stock sales by certain executives.

Jan. 20, 2006: Paul Baker resigns as chief financial officer.

Jan. 23, 2006: Receives extension to report fourth-quarter results.

Feb. 21, 2006: Chairman and CEO Scott Harmon resigns.

Apr. 10, 2006: Motive delisted by NASDAQ.

Oct. 24, 2006: Mike Fitzpatrick named CFO.

Jan. 16, 2007: Receives a cash infusion from Elion, a telecommunications provider in Estonia.

Apr. 12, 2007: SEC inquiry becomes a formal investigation.

June 17, 2008: Alcatel-Lucent announces intent to acquire Motive at $2.23 per share.

References

External links
 Official website – archived October 2005

Companies based in Austin, Texas
Companies established in 1997